Frederick or Fred Collins may refer to:
 Frederick Collins (cricketer), Australian cricketer
 Frederick Howard Collins (indexer) (1857–1910), British indexer and writer
 Frederick Howard Collins (commissioner) (1903–1982), Commissioner of Yukon from 1955 to 1962
 Fred Collins (golfer), English golfer